Caldicott is a surname. Notable people with the surname include:

David Caldicott, Irish medical doctor
Fiona Caldicott, British psychiatrist
John Caldicott (1828–1895), Anglican priest
Helen Caldicott (b. 1938), Australian physician
John Moore Caldicott, Rhodesian politician

See also
Caldecott (surname)